Roy Hughes may refer to:

 Roy Hughes, Baron Islwyn (1925–2003), British Labour Party politician and union organiser, MP for Newport 1966–1983, for Newport East 1983–1997
 Roy Hughes (baseball) (1911–1995), American professional baseball player, played in the Major Leagues 1935-46
 Roy Hughes (bridge), champion contract bridge player and author